The 1886 St. Louis Maroons finished with a 43–79 record in the National League, finishing in sixth place. After the season, the team was purchased by John T. Brush and moved to Indianapolis, becoming the Hoosiers.

Regular season

Season standings

Record vs. opponents

Opening Day lineup

Roster

Player stats

Batting

Starters by position 
Note: Pos = Position; G = Games played; AB = At bats; H = Hits; Avg. = Batting average; HR = Home runs; RBI = Runs batted in

Other batters 
Note: G = Games played; AB = At bats; H = Hits; Avg. = Batting average; HR = Home runs; RBI = Runs batted in

Pitching

Starting pitchers 
Note: G = Games pitched; IP = Innings pitched; W = Wins; L = Losses; ERA = Earned run average; SO = Strikeouts

Relief pitchers 
Note: G = Games pitched; W = Wins; L = Losses; SV = Saves; ERA = Earned run average; SO = Strikeouts

References 
 1886 St. Louis Maroons team page at Baseball Reference

St. Louis Maroons seasons
St. Louis Maroons season
St Louis